Sun Yuen Long Centre is a private housing estate and shopping centre in Yuen Long, New Territories, Hong Kong, above Light Rail Yuen Long stop and next to MTR West Rail line Yuen Long station. Starting on 1 September 2015, it become Yoho Mall II when at the same time opened a new shopping mall on the opposite called YOHO MALL I along Castle Peak Road (Yuen Long). It consists of five 31-floor high-rise buildings developed in 1993 by Sun Hung Kai Properties and Kowloon-Canton Railway Corporation (now MTR Corporation).

In December 2011, Sun Yuen Long Centre Shopping Centre began an extensive interior renovation. Currently, many of the stores and services remain open and passage through the mall to the MTR is still available.

References

External links

Official website of YOHO MALL http://www.yohomall.hk/eng/main/HomePage
Official website of Sun Yuen Long Centre

Yuen Long
Yuen Long District
Sun Hung Kai Properties
MTR Corporation
Commercial buildings completed in 1993
Private housing estates in Hong Kong
Shopping centres in Hong Kong
Shopping malls established in 1993
1993 establishments in Hong Kong